Mortville Manor is a point-and-click adventure game developed and published by Lankhor in 1987 for Atari ST. It was ported to the Amstrad CPC, Amiga, and Sinclair QL. An MS-DOS version was released in 1988, adapted by Clement Roques. The game was released in French, English (Translated by Mick Andon) and German. The game incorporates speech synthesis. The game sold 10,000 copies around Europe.  Mortville Manor was followed by its sequel Maupiti Island, taking place on a tropical island.

Plot
Jérôme Lange, a famous private investigator, receives a letter from his childhood friend Julia Defranck, requesting him to investigate some strange events in Mortville Manor. Upon arrival Jérôme is informed of Julia's death. With a storm approaching, the investigator begins his search around the manor.

Gameplay
The game can be solved extremely quickly if you are given the solution. After a French computer magazine published a walkthrough, allowing its readers to solve the game without even having understood the plot, an altered version was published and replaced the original. This new version was completely identical except that at a specific point in the adventure, the player had to correctly answer a series of questions about the game's plot to be allowed to continue further.

Reception

References

External links
 Lankhor.net (archived)
 

1987 video games
Amiga games
Amstrad CPC games
Atari ST games
Detective video games
DOS games
Lankhor games
Point-and-click adventure games
ScummVM-supported games
Sinclair QL games
Single-player video games
Video games developed in France
Works set in country houses